Harry Rountree (26 January 1878 – 26 September 1950) was a prolific illustrator working in England around the turn of the 20th century. Born in Auckland, New Zealand, he moved to London in 1901, when he was 23 years old.

Life
Harry Rountree was born in 1878 to Irish banker, Stephen Gilbert Rountree and Julia Bartley, the niece of New Zealand architect Edward Bartley.

Rountree was educated at Auckland's Queen's College, and began working at Wilson and Horton Printers in the city, designing show-cards, advertisements, and product labels. He progressed to become special artist for the Auckland Weekly News, published by Wilson and Horton, with his earliest signed drawings, quite serious in tone and subject matter, appearing in 1899. New Zealand formed part of the readership of the London periodical press at this time and Rountree developed the ambition to join the ranks of its most prominent illustrators. As he later stated in an interview with A B Cooper for The Boy's Own Paper:

The first stage to realizing his ambition came with his departure from his employer at the beginning of March 1901:

He travelled to England on the Orient Line steamship RMS Omrah, taking with him a portfolio of his work to impress British art editors. Going via the Suez Canal, he left Sydney on 10 April 1901 with members of the New Zealand bowling team. His sketches of one of their number, J V Dingle, completed on arrival in London, were sent home for publication by his former employer.

Rather than travel by ship the whole way, Rountree added a Continental flavour to the close of his journey, as was described for the New Zealand Herald by "Our own correspondent. London, June 8":

At that time the market for magazine illustration was flourishing: 

Although Rountree contributed many illustrations to The King magazine in mid-late 1901, he struggled to make very much progress towards his objective. His first encounters with art editors provided him with few commissions and little encouragement, so he enrolled in the life drawing class under Percival Gaskell at the Regent Street Polytechnic's School of Art for the academic year 1901-02. He was awarded a second-class pass in July 1902, but by that time had already met Sam Hield Hamer, editor of Little Folks magazine, who invited him to illustrate his story 'Extracts from the Diary of a Duckling'. By this fortunate meeting, Rountree discovered his forte in animal illustration, which he developed by frequent sketching visits to London Zoo.

It was after this commission that Rountree's career began to flourish and he became in demand as an illustrator. Rountree is noted for his illustrations of British golf courses and golfing caricatures. His work features in publications such as The Strand Magazine, Cassell's Magazine, Pearson's, The Sketch, The Illustrated London News, Playtime, Little Folks, and many others.

Rountree was one of the leading illustrators selected by Percy Bradshaw for inclusion in his The Art of the Illustrator (1917-1918) which presented a separate portfolio for each of twenty illustrators. Rountree also served as a consultant at the Percy Bradshaw's Press Art School, a school teaching painting, drawing, and illustration by correspondence. The consultants gave feedback on the work submitted by the students.

During the First World War, he served as a captain in the Royal Engineers.

Rountree produced well-liked cartoons for the magazine Punch from 1905 to 1939, and also created advertising, posters and book illustrations for writers such as P. G. Wodehouse and Arthur Conan Doyle.

Death
Harry Rountree died of cancer in the West Cornwall Hospital, Penzance, Cornwall on 26 September 1950, aged 72 years, being survived by his wife and two children. Fellow artist Bernard Ninnes wrote an appreciation of his work to accompany his obituary in the St Ives Times:

As an artist he stood alone in his own sphere as the supreme delineator of bird and animal life. His drawings and paintings in this specialised field bore the authentic stamp of deepest study and intimate familiarity of these subjects; the expression of anatomical diversity, with the constructional variety of fur and feather revealed the sum of a lifetime's keenest observation...To his animals and birds he often gave a whimsical or semi-human twist which has made them loved by generations of children... When first I knew him some twenty years ago at the London Sketch Club and The Savage his charming personality, the wit of his drawings and rare ability as a raconteur made him outstanding in a group which included such names as John Hassall, W Heath Robinson and Lawson Wood. He was one of the grand company of illustrators of the Edwardian and first Georgian period [George V 1910-1936], a time when illustration had reached a pinnacle of excellence, and Harry Rountree was in the van.

The probate valuation of his estate was £4581 1s 7d.

A commemorative bronze plaque by the sculptor W. C. H. King was erected on Smeaton's Pier, St Ives for his contribution to the artistic and civic life of the town.

Selected works

Periodicals
By title, including annuals, containing Harry Rountree's illustrations within the years (not necessarily all) indicated. A representative sample from a total in excess of 100. Source:

 Auckland Weekly News, Wilson and Horton, 1899-1936
 Blackie's Children's Annual, Blackie and Son, 1913-1935
 Blighty, W. Speaight & Sons, 1916-1917; 1939-1943
 The Boy's Own Paper, Religious Tract Society, 1902-1944
 Bystander, H. R. Baines & Co., 1903-1930
 The Captain, George Newnes, 1901-1923
 Cassell's Children's Annual, Cassell, 1916-1933
 Fry's Magazine, George Newnes, 1905-1914
 Golf Illustrated, Golf Illustrated, 1909-1932
 The Humorist, George Newnes, 1922-1929
 Illustrated Sporting & Dramatic News, Illustrated Newspapers, 1911-1932
 I Pass This On To You, Women's Gas Council, 1940-1951
 Joy Street, Basil Blackwell, 1924-1936
 The King, George Newnes, 1901-1902
 Little Folks, Cassell, 1902-1933
 London Opinion, George Newnes, 1909-1931
 The Merry-Go-Round, Basil Blackwell, 1923-1939
 Little Dots|Our Little Dots/Little Dots, RTS, 1928-1936
 The Passing Show, Odhams, 1915-1934
 Pearson's Magazine, Pearson, 1905-1935
 Playtime, Amalgamated Press, 1919-1920
 The Prize, Wells Gardner, Darton and Co., 1910-1933
 Punch, or the London Charivari, Punch Office, 1906-1939
 The Quiver, Cassell, 1903-1932
 Radio Times, BBC, 1929-1944
 The Red Magazine, Amalgamated Press, 1910-1920
 The Royal Magazine, Pearson, 1904-1922
 The Sketch, Illustrated London News & Sketch, 1905-1942
 The Strand Magazine, George Newnes, 1902-1930
 Sunday Reading for the Young, Wells Gardner, Darton, and Co., 1902-1915
 The Tatler, Nineteen Hundred Publishing, 1904-1937
 Tiny Tots, Cassell, 1907-1926
 The Wide World Magazine, George Newnes, 1902-1924
 Wonderland Annual, Amalgamated Press, 1920-1929
 Zoo, Odhams, 1936-1938

Books
Illustrated, and occasionally authored or co-authored, by Harry Rountree. A representative sample from a total, with editions, numbering in excess of 400. Source:

 Harry Rountree, The Animal Game Book, George Allen, 1903
 Harry Rountree, The Child's Book of Knowledge, Grant Richards, 1903
 Harry Rountree & S H Hamer, Quackles Junior, Cassell, 1903
 Harry A. Spurr (ed.), Fairy Tales by Dumas, Frederick A. Stokes, 1904
 Harry Rountree & S H Hamer, Archibald's Amazing Adventure, Or, The Tip-top Tale, Cassell, 1905
 E. Nesbit, Pug Peter, Alf Cooke, 1905
 S H Hamer & Harry Rountree, The Young Gullivers, Cassell, 1906
 Amy Steadman (ed.), Stories from Grimm, T C & E C Jack, 1906
 Joel Chandler Harris, Uncle Remus, Thomas Nelson, 1906
 J James Ridge, Toksikatem Castle, S W Partridge, 1906
 Harry Rountree, Harry Rountree's Annual, Cassell, 1907
 Alton Towers, Billy Bunce, Alf Cooke, 1907
 G. E. Mitton (ed.), The Swiss Family Robinson, A & C Black, 1907
 Bertram Atkey, Folk of the Wild, Grant Richards, 1907
 Lewis Carroll, Alice's Adventures in Wonderland, Thomas Nelson, 1908
 S H Hamer, The Forest Foundling, Duckworth, 1908
 S H Hamer, The Dolomites, Methuen, 1910
 Bernard Darwin, The Golf Courses of the British Isles, Duckworth, 1910
 Baldwin S Harvey, The Magic Dragon, Duckworth, 1911
 various writers, The Spell of the Open Air, T N Foulis, c.1912
 Richard Jefferies, Bevis, The Story of a Boy, Duckworth, 1913
 Charles S Bayne (ed.), My Book of Best Fairy Tales, Cassell, 1915
 Harry Rountree, Rountree's Ridiculous Rabbits (1 & 2), H Stevenson, 1916
 Christine Chaundler, Little Squirrel Tickletail, Cassell, 1917
 Albert Bigelow Paine, The Arkansaw Bear, George G. Harrap, 1919
 Sir William Schooling, The Hudson's Bay Company 1670-1920, HBC, 1920
 Blanche Winder (retold by), Aesop's Fables, Ward, Lock, 1924
 Who's Who at the Zoo, Dean's Rag Book Co., 1925
 Mabel Marlowe, Lazy Lob, Basil Blackwell, 1926
 Lewis Carroll, Alice in Wonderland & Through the Looking Glass, Collins Clear-Type Press, 1928
 Hector Bolitho, The New Zealanders, J. M. Dent, 1928
 Richard P Russ, Caesar, The Life Story of a Panda Leopard, G. P. Putnam's Sons, 1930
 Lynda Rountree, Ronald, Rupert and Reg, Frederick Warne, 1930
 L & H Rountree and C E Bradley, Dicky Duck & Wonderful Walter, Frederick Warne, 1931
 Olwen Bowen, Beetles and Things, Elkin Mathews, 1931
 Aesop's Fables, Collins, Children's Press, 1934
 A Book about Animals, Blackie & Son, 1934
 Peter Lawless (ed.), The Golfer's Companion, J M Dent, 1937
 High Jinks, Birn Brothers, 1937
 Olive Dehn, The Nixie from Rotterdam, Basil Blackwell, 1937
 Viola Bayley, The Ways of Wonderland, James Nisbet, 1937
 Enid Blyton, The Children of Cherry Tree Farm, Country Life, 1940
 Enid Blyton, The Secret Mountain, Basil Blackwell, 1941
 Christine Chaundler, The Odd Ones, Country Life, 1941
 Little Things, WHC [W H Cornelius], c.1944
 Charles Heslop, The Farmyard in Spring [one of four], c.1945
 Winifred Humphreys, Wog & Wig, Franklyn Ward & Wheeler, 1947
 Hugh Gardner, Bruno Bear, Edmund Ward, 1951

Notes

References

External links
 
 
 
  (3 "from old catalog")
An article and full bibliography by Michael Pirie is contained in Studies in Illustration nos 59-63 published by the Imaginative Book Illustration Society www.bookillustration.org
Rountree, Harry in Oxford Dictionary of National Biography

People from Auckland
New Zealand illustrators
British illustrators
New Zealand children's book illustrators
British children's book illustrators
20th-century illustrators of fairy tales
1878 births
1950 deaths
New Zealand emigrants to the United Kingdom